Mir (also Romanized as Mīr; also known as Kashnab and Rashāb Dar) is a village in Paeen Taleqan Rural District, in the Central District of Taleqan County, Alborz Province, Iran. At the 2006 census, its population was 286, in 121 families.

References 

Populated places in Taleqan County